The Canadian Corps was a World War I corps formed from the Canadian Expeditionary Force.

Canadian Corps may also refer to the following:

Canadian Corps (World War II), the unnumbered Canadian Corps formed during World War II
I Canadian Corps, a Canadian Army corps in World War II that fought in Italy and the Netherlands
II Canadian Corps, a Canadian Army corps in World War II that fought in France, Belgium, the Netherlands and Germany
Canada Corps, a volunteer group from Canada